Habronattus hallani is a species of jumping spider. It is found in the United States and Mexico.

References

Salticidae
Articles created by Qbugbot
Spiders described in 1973